Nemesis Sub-Terra is a  drop tower dark ride haunted attraction located at Alton Towers theme park in Staffordshire, United Kingdom. The ride opened to the public on 24 March 2012 and ceased operation in August 2015 but has been rumoured to make a return in the 2023 season. Its theme focused on the discovery of a nest of eggs in a network of caves, which was loosely adapted from the concept of the park's 1994 inverted roller coaster, Nemesis.

The ride

As the entrance was approached, one of the Phalanx operatives shouted orders at riders to move into the batching area in a group of 40 in front of an entrance of two faux-lifts. Riders were then instructed to watch a pre-show video, which outlined the story of how one of the Nemesis creature's eggs had been made safe for viewing by the public. The Phalanx operative then made a special warning to riders that there were live actors present throughout the experience and anyone uncomfortable with this should leave the batching area. Riders then moved into the lifts, where it was further explained that it was travelling down an underground shaft, whilst lighting and sound effects created the illusion of subterranean travel.

The lift door opened to reveal a cavern, or catacomb, just ahead of the main ride chamber – which remained sealed at this point. The cavern was themed with rock effects to give the impression of a recently excavated underground site.

The main ride chamber then opened, and the aforementioned egg could be seen in the centre of the room, with four sci-fi-style zappers focusing upon it.

Four rows of ten seats faced the egg centre-piece and riders were ushered into the seats and told to pull down their lap bar with considerable urgency by the actors.

Details of the discovery of the alien egg were then played via TV screens, and riders were told that it had recently been displaying signs of life. Midway through this presentation however, the TV screens cut out and lighting effects lead riders to believe that there had been some kind of power failure. Sirens then started to go off, and after a few seconds the lights went out altogether. The lights were then restored to reveal that the egg had hatched, and sound effects indicated that a creature was moving around the ride chamber. Each gondola then abruptly dropped around 20 feet (6 metres) to the bottom of the chamber. The ride was programmed so that each gondola dropped at a slightly different time to the others - to increase the tension for the rider. After the freefall, lighting effects revealed the other eggs that were unsafe to view. The riders were then put back into pitch-blackness, and slowly lifted up to where the main egg lied. Rapid light flashes occurred and water was sprayed at riders whilst more sound effects were played. 'Back pokers' and 'leg ticklers' surprised riders, giving the impression that the monster was in close proximity. Air bursts were activated, which blew onto the back of the neck of the rider, imitating the monster's close proximity.

Sirens then began to sound, as a 30-second countdown timer displayed on the screens, indicating that the facility would self-destruct when the time limit expired. Phalanx security personnel quickly ushered riders into the escape lifts. The lift began to ascend, but shortly after the lights flickered before then once more, plunging the riders into pitch darkness. The lift then began to shake and bang violently. A roof panel became dislodged and the wall panels moved, simulating the alien creature attacking the lift and attempting to gain access.

Once the lift doors opened riders were greeted by a Phalanx operative wearing a gas mask and covered in blood, holding a small torch. Those in the left lift were abruptly led out, whilst those in the right lift were kept in by another masked actor, who let them out a few seconds later. Riders then entered a strobe maze, whereby powerful strobe flashes to disorientate them. Metal chain link fences surrounded riders, whilst "contaminated" Phalanx operatives jumped out at them. Air cannons, strobe lighting and loud sound effects simulated the supposed 'decontamination' of the visitors. Riders were then chased out of the ride by a 'rabid' Phalanx worker.

Planning and Construction
Plans for the ride were submitted in August 2011, although they only showed the exterior of the buildings; revealing nothing of the interior. Construction commenced in October 2011, with the site being closed off to the public during the Scarefest event.

Pictures were leaked in early January 2012 of the ride mechanism before installation. They revealed the ride to be an ABC Rides manufactured drop tower; similar to ones previously installed in both the London and Blackpool Dungeon attractions. In a publicity stunt Jack Osborne was appointed as Director of Fear for the attraction.

Images of the ride's interior were released on 24 January, via an official Twitter page by the name of Phalanx Control.

In February 2012 Alton Towers started marketing by making a video of a bottomless lift, hinting at what may be coming with the ride. The ride was at this time also confirmed by the Alton Towers website as having a height restriction of 1.4 m.

The ride was tweaked after significant negative feedback from the general public. The changes to the ride were believed to have been implemented during the park's closure due to high winds on 4 April. However, this was not the case, as the entire site, plus other nearby attractions, was deemed unsafe because of the high winds and proximity to large trees, and the attraction was improved during planned maintenance sessions before and after the theme-parks normal public opening hours. Various trees were felled and cut back during the following weeks to improve safety in future bad weather.

From 20 May 2012 the attraction closed for a period of six days (Sunday 20th to Friday 25th inclusive) in order for improvements to be made. Alton Towers Operations and Developments Director Mark Kerrigan revealed that the ride has yet to be officially completed by the park. In November 2015, as part of the downsizing of the theme park's operation in response to the Smiler incident earlier that year, Alton Towers announced that six of its attractions would not reopen the following season, including Nemesis Sub-Terra. The ride was eventually removed from the park's website before the start of the 2019 season, indicating permanent closure. This makes it one of the shortest-lived rides in the resort's history.

Project 42
For the park's annual Halloween event, Scarefest, the Sub Terra building hosted the scare attraction Project 42 in 2018 and 2019. The attraction was themed around a viral outbreak, causing test subjects to develop animalistic qualities, and made use of most the interior of the original attraction.

Possible return 
At the end of the 2022 season, construction fences were placed around the ride, and all the external, rotten queue line was ripped up. Drone shots over the park have shown that the queue line has been replaced, leading to much speculation about a possible return in 2023 to help with capacity whilst its namesake ride, Nemesis, is closed.

Subsequent drone shots have shown the ride building has been cleaned, and the faded “Phalanx” logo and subsequent building markings have been freshly repainted , leading to further speculation that the attraction will soon return to operation.

References

External links
 Nemesis: Sub-Terra official mini-site
 Nemesis: Sub-Terra information on TowersStreet

Alton Towers
Dark rides
2012 establishments in England
2015 disestablishments in England
Amusement rides introduced in 2012
Amusement rides manufactured by ABC Rides
Amusement rides that closed in 2015